The Fortescue three-toed slider (Lerista amicorum)  is a species of skink, a lizard in the family Scincidae. The species is endemic to Australia.

Etymology
The specific name, amicorum (which means "of the friends" in Latin), is in honor of Australian zoologists (and friends), William Henry "Harry" Butler and Athol M. Douglas, both of whom collected the first specimens in 1964.

Geographic range
L. amicorum is found in the Australian state of Western Australia.

Habitat
The preferred natural habitats of L. amicorum are grassland and savanna.

Description
L. amicorum has three toes on each of its four feet.

Reproduction
L. amicorum is oviparous.

References

Further reading
Cogger HG (2014). Reptiles and Amphibians of Australia, Seventh Edition. Clayton, Victoria, Australia: CSIRO Publishing. xxx + 1,033 pp. .
Smith LA, Adams M (2007). "Revision of the Lerista muelleri species-group (Lacertilia: Scincidae) in Western Australia, with a redescription of L. muelleri (Fischer, 1881) and the description of nine new species". Records of the Western Australian Museum 23: 309–357. (Lerista amicorum, new species, pp. 320–322). 
Wilson S, Swan G (2013). A Complete Guide to Reptiles of Australia, Fourth Edition. Sydney: New Holland Publishers. 522 pp. .

Lerista
Reptiles described in 2007
Taxa named by Lawrence Alec Smith
Taxa named by Mark Adams (herpetologist)